Olićko Lake is a lake of Bosnia and Herzegovina, the lake is near of village Olići, in the municipality of Šipovo.

See also
List of lakes in Bosnia and Herzegovina

References

Lakes of Bosnia and Herzegovina